Coleophora hydrolapathella is a moth of the family Coleophoridae. It is found from Great Britain to Poland, Slovakia, Hungary and Romania and from Norway and Sweden to Belgium, Germany and Austria. It is also known from Latvia and southern Russia.

The wingspan is 13–14 mm. Adults are on wing from June to early August in one generation per year.

The larvae feed on the flowers and seeds of water dock (Rumex hydrolapathum). They create a reddish-brown, tubular case made entirely of silk. Full-grown larvae attach their case to the stem of the food plant and hibernate.

References

hydrolapathella
Moths described in 1921
Moths of Europe
Taxa named by Erich Martin Hering